Bābak Khorramdin (Persian: بابک خرمدین, Bābak-e Khorramdin, from Middle Persian "Pāpak"/"Pābag", meaning "Young Father"; 795 or 798 – January 838) was one of the main Iranian revolutionary leaders of the Iranian Khorram-Dinān ("Those of the joyous religion"), which was a local freedom movement fighting the Abbasid Caliphate. Khorramdin appears to be a compound analogous to dorustdin "orthodoxy" and Behdin "Good Religion" (Zoroastrianism), and are considered an offshoot of neo-Mazdakism.  Babak's Iranianizing rebellion, from its base in Azerbaijan in northwestern Iran, called for a return of the political glories of the Iranian past.  The Khorramdin rebellion of Babak spread to the Western and Central parts of Iran and lasted more than twenty years before it was defeated when Babak was betrayed.  Babak's uprising showed the continuing strength in Azerbaijan of ancestral Iranian local feelings.

Etymology 
Bābak is a New Persian name meaning "father", which is derived from the Middle Persian Pāpak/Pābag (𐭯𐭠𐭯𐭪𐭩), a common name in pre-Islamic Iran and also the hereditary name of the Sasanian Empire, whose founder Ardashir I, was the son of a prince named Pabag. The original name of Babak was al-Hasan.

Background 

Babak was born in 795 (or 798) in Bilalabad in the Mimadh district of the Ardabil area, which was part of Azerbaijan, a region in north-western Iran. The Mimadh district had provided the Sasanian marzban ("margrave") of Ardabil with troops during the Muslim conquest of Iran in 633–654, which resulted in the fall of the Sasanians and the conquest of Azerbaijan. The region was briefly occupied by the Khazars in 730–731, and had since the mid 8th century been under occupation by the Arab Rawadid clan. Azerbaijan was populated by an Iranian people known as the Adhari, who although closely related, were distinct from the Persians. They spoke Adhari, which according to the 10th-century geographer al-Maqdisi, was similar to Persian.

Babak was most likely himself not of pure Persian extraction, but of Adhari. His mother Mahru (meaning "Moon-Face") was a non-Muslim wet-nurse from Azerbaijan. She is described as being "one-eyed" in Muslim sources and furthermore, by Al-Tabari, as having become pregnant with her son after being raped by a mercenary.  However, these stories are more than likely fabrications created by hostile authors in order to disgrace Babak. As for the identity Babak's father, there are also multiple conflicting accounts.  Al-Waqidi, as quoted by Ibn Al-Nadim, states that he was an oil-seller from al-Mada'in (Ctesiphon), who had settled in Azerbaijan.  Crone takes this to mean that he was of Aramean origin.  However, Dinawari, a contemporary of Babak, concludes and states that there is ample evidence to support that his father's true name was Mutahar, a descendant of Abu Muslim through his daughter, Fāṭema. C.E. Bosworth argues that more credence should be lent to this latter account, as other sources are hostile and are eager to propose lowly or otherwise less honorable origins for Babak.  In the other sources, his name is variably given as Abdallah, Merdas, Matar, Amir ibn Abdallah, or Amir ibn Ahad, all which suggest that he was seemingly a Muslim. Likewise, Babak's father is also the subject of derogatory fabrication in Muslim sources.

Masudi noted in his ″Murūj al-dhahab wa maʿādin al-jawāhir″: ″What seems to us to be true and proven is that Bābak was a son of Moṭahhar, the son of Abū Moslem's daughter Fāṭema, and that the Fāṭemīya group of the Khurramites took their name from this Fāṭema, not from Fāṭema the daughter of God's Prophet″.

The original faith of Babak is uncertain; he was born with the Muslim name of al-Hasan, and his three brothers, Mu'awiya, Abdallah, and Ishaq, also had Muslim names. Having a Muslim name is not in itself proof of any religious beliefs, as it was not uncommon for people to have a Muslim name in order "to move freely in Muslim society by virtue of their high position in their own community, such as the Armenian princes" (Crone).  According to Crone, who follows Al-Waqidi, Babak's parents were probably no more than landless villagers, but knew that Babak and his brothers' futures lay with the Arab warlords of Azerbaijan, and thus as a way of "adapting to the standards of new the world," raised them as Muslims.

Early life 

During Babak's youth, his travelling father was killed near Sabalan. Till the age of twelve, Babak worked as a cowherd, and afterwards entered the service of an Arab warlord named Shibl ibn al-Muthanna al-Azdi in Sarab, where he worked as a groom and servant. The ghilman ("slaves") of Shibl taught Babak how to play the lute. Babak also learned to recite poetry, probably in the local Adhari dialect. According to the 11th-century writer Abu'l Ma'ali, Babak played the lute and sang songs for the locals whilst working as a fruit vendor in the village. Babak later established himself in the city of Tabriz. There he worked under another Arab warlord, Muhammad ibn Rawwad Azdi for two years, until he reached adulthood and left for his village, Bilalabad. There Babak encountered a wealthy and influential landlord named Javidhan, who was reportedly impressed with the latters cleverness, and as result recruited him into his service. Unlike the previous men Babak had served, Javidhan was a local Iranian, and the leader of one of the two Khurramite movements in Azerbaijan. The leader of the other Khurramite movement was a certain Abu Imran, who often clashed with Javidhans forces. During one of the clashes, Abu Imran was defeated and killed, whilst Javidhan was mortally wounded, dying three days later. Javidhan was succeeded by Babak, who had already converted to Khurramism under the latters service. It was most probably during this period that Babak changed his name from al-Hasan to Babak.

Movement 

In 755, Abu Muslim was murdered. Although he had helped the Abbasids to defeat the former Caliphs, the Umayyad dynasty, the ruling Caliph had given the order to kill him, probably because of his increasing popularity among Iranians and non-Muslims.
This incident led to many revolts, mostly by angry Khurramiyyah (Khorram-Dinān) and some Zoroastrians. This, in turn, forced the Caliphs to use more violence against the Iranian population in order to keep the eastern provinces under control. The constant revolts did not come to an end in the following decades, and the Iranian population of the Caliphate was constantly being oppressed.

Babak joined the Khurramiyyah (Khorram-Dinān). The story of joining the Khorrami movement is being told in Waqed's account, in summary, as follows:

Under the direction of his mentor Javidhan, a leader of one of the sects of the Khorramdin, Babak's knowledge of history, geography, and the latest battle tactics strengthened his position as a favorite candidate for commander during the early wars against the Arab occupiers.

Bābak was a highly spiritual person who respected his Zoroastrian heritage. He made every possible effort to bring Iranians together and also with leaders such as Maziar to form a united front against the Arab Caliph. According to the medieval historian, Ibn Esfandyar, who composed the book Tarikh-e Tabaristan (History of Tabaristan), Maziar said:

However, one of the most dramatic periods in the history of Iran was set under Bābak's leadership between 816–837. During these most crucial years, they not only fought against the Caliphate, but also for the preservation of Persian language and culture.

After the death of Javidhan, Babak married Javidhan's wife and became the Khorramis' leader, sometime in the year 816–17 during al-Ma'mun's reign. Babak incited his followers to rebel against the caliphate.

According to Vladimir Minorsky, around the 9th–10th century:

At that time of Babak, there were Khorramis scattered in many regions of Iran, besides Adharbayjan, reportedly in Tabarestan, Khorasan, Balkh, Isfahan, Kashan, Qom, Ray, Karaj, Hamadan, Lorestan, Khuzestan as well as in Basra, and Armenia.

Tabari records that Babak claimed he possessed Javadan's spirit and that Babak became active in 816–817. In 819–820 Yahya ibn Mu'adh fought against Babak, but could not defeat him. Two years later Babak vanquished the forces of Isa ibn Muhammad ibn Abi Khalid. In 824–825 the caliphal general Ahmad ibn al Junayd was sent against Babak. Babak defeated and captured him.

In 827–828 Muhammad ibn Humayd Tusi was dispatched to fight Babak. He won a victory and sent some captured enemy, but not Babak, to al-Ma'mun. However, about two years later, on June 9, 829, Babak won a decisive victory over this general at Hashtadsar. Muhammad ibn Humayd lost his life. Many of his soldiers were killed. The survivors fled in disarray.

Babak's victories over Arab generals were associated with his possession of Badd fort and inaccessible mountain stronghold according to the Arab historians who mentioned that his influence also extended even to the territories of today's Azerbaijan - ″southward to near Ardabil and Marand, eastward to the Caspian Sea and the Shamakhi district and Shervan, northward to the Muqan (Moḡan) steppe and the Aras river bank, westward to the districts of Jolfa, Nakjavan, and Marand”.

In 835–836 the caliph al-Mu'tasim sent his outstanding general Afshin against Babak. Afshin rebuilt fortresses. He employed a relay system to protect supply caravans. Babak tried to capture the money being sent to pay Afshin's army, but was himself surprised, lost many men and barely escaped. He did succeed in capturing some supplies and inflicting some hardship on his enemies. Amongst Babak's commander, various names have been mentioned including Azin, Rostam, Tarkhan, Mua’wiyah and Abdullah.

The next year Babak routed the forces of Afshin's subordinate, Bugha al-Kabir. In 837–838 al-Mu'tasim reinforced Afshin and provided him clear military instructions. Patiently following these enabled Afshin to capture Babak's stronghold of Badhdh. Babak escaped. Al-Mu'tasim sent a safety guarantee for Babak to Afshin. This was taken to Babak who was very displeased. He said: "Better to live for just a single day as a ruler than to live for forty years as an abject slave."

He decided to leave the country for the Byzantine Empire and on his way Babak met Sahl Smbatean (Sahl ibn Sunbat in Arab sources), Prince of Khachen, who was Armenian due to the Armenian historiography and Caucasian Albanian due to the Adharbayjani historiography. Sahl Smbatian, however, handed Babak over to Afshin in return for a large reward. Al-Mu'tasim commanded his general to bring Babak to him. Afshin informed Babak of this and told him since Babak might never return, this was the time to take a last look around. At Babak's request, Afshin allowed his prisoner to go to Badhdh. There Babak walked through his ruined stronghold one night until dawn.

Eventually, Bābak, his wife, and his warriors were forced to leave Ghaleye Bābak after 23 years of constant campaigns.

Death 
 
He was eventually betrayed by Afshin and was handed over to the Abbasid Caliph. During Bābak's execution, the Caliph's henchmen first cut off his legs and hands in order to convey the most devastating message to his followers. It's said that Bābak bravely rinsed his face with the drained blood pouring out of his cuts, thus preventing the Caliph and the rest of the Abbasid army from seeing his pale face, a result of the heavy loss of blood. He was then gibbeted alive whilst sewn into a cow's skin with the horns at ear level to gradually crush his head as it dried out.

Legacy 

Babak Khorramdin was not well known outside academia until the 20th century; however, due to Soviet nation building efforts and Babak's following of the teachings of Mazdak with its proto-socialist themes, Babak Khorramdin was proclaimed a national hero in the Azerbaijan Soviet Socialist Republic. For example, the Soviet era scholar Ziya Bunyadov, claimed that "Babak was a national hero of Azerbaijani people" while the Russian ethnologist, historian and anthropologist Victor Schnirelmann dismisses Bunyadov's theory, criticizing Bunyadov for not mentioning that Babak spoke Persian, and ignoring the witness accounts of Babak's contemporaries who call him Persian. To this day, in the modern Republic of Azerbaijan, Babak is a cult figure and celebrated as a national hero. A city and a district in Azerbaijan were named after Babak, and a popular Azerbaijani film was released in 1979 about his life. 

In modern Iran, due to the rise of nationalism in the 20th century, and renewed interest in pre-Islamic Iran, Babak Khorramdin was rediscovered during the reign of Reza Shah, and is celebrated as a national hero. However, Babak remains a controversial figure in the Islamic Republic, whose idolization is criticized by some Shia clerics.

References

Sources 

 
 
 
 
 

 
 

790s births
838 deaths
Iranian Zoroastrians
Iranian rebels
9th-century executions by the Abbasid Caliphate
8th-century Iranian people
9th-century Iranian people
Rebels from the Abbasid Caliphate
Khurramites
Azerbaijan under the Abbasid Caliphate
Converts to Zoroastrianism